CTV was an analogue pay television package, available in Scandinavia. It was mostly using Norwegian satellites such as Thor 1 and Intelsat 707 to broadcast basic channels to Scandinavian homes, using the D2-MAC transmission system. CTV was operated by Telenor, who in 1997 joined forces with Multichoice (owned by Canal+) to launch the Canal Digital platform. Most of the CTV channels were closed down in September 2001.

Channels carried on CTV included:
CNN International
MTV Nordic
Discovery Channel/The Children's Channel
Eurosport
Sky News & Documentaries
Sky Entertainment
Cartoon Network/TNT
BBC Prime

References

Direct broadcast satellite services
Television in the Nordic countries
1997 establishments in Europe
2001 disestablishments in Europe